The FIBA Africa Championship 1968, was the fourth FIBA Africa Championship regional basketball championship held by FIBA Africa, which also served as Africa qualifier for the 1968 Summer Olympics, granting berths to the champion and runner-up. It was held in Morocco between 29 March and 6 April 1968. Nine national teams entered the event under the auspices of FIBA Africa, the sport's regional governing body. The city of Casablanca hosted the tournament. Senegal won their first title after defeating hosts Morocco in the final.

Format
Teams were split into two round-robin groups of five and four teams. The top two teams from each group advanced to the knockout semi-finals. The winners in the semi-finals competed for the championship and were granted berths to the 1968 Summer Olympics, while the losing teams from the semifinals competed for third place in an extra game. 
The third and fourth teams from each group were cross-paired and competed in a separate bracket to define places fifth through eighth in the final standings. The bottom team in the five-team group occupied ninth place in the final standings.

First round

Group A

|}

Group B

|}

Knockout stage

Championship bracket

Semifinals

Third place

Final

Classification stage

Final standings

External links
 1968 African Championship for Men, FIBA.com.

B
1968 in African basketball
AfroBasket
B
March 1968 sports events in Africa
April 1968 sports events in Africa